Sixth Army may refer to:

Germany
 6th Army (German Empire), a World War I field Army
 6th Army (Wehrmacht), a World War II field army
 6th Panzer Army

Russia
 6th Army (Russian Empire)
 6th Army (RSFSR)
 6th Army (Soviet Union)

Others
 Sixth Army (France)
 Sixth Army (Italy)
 Sixth Army (Austria-Hungary)
 Sixth Army (Ottoman Empire)
 Sixth Army (Japan)
 Sixth United States Army